Ardha Shathabdam is a 2021 Indian Telugu-language action drama film written and directed by debutant Rawindra Pulle. Produced by Radhakrishna Telu & Chitti Kiran Ramoju  the film stars Karthik Rathnam, Naveen Chandra, Krishna Priya and Suhas in prominent roles. The film premiered on 11 June 2021 on Aha. The film is set in 2003 and based on the caste system in India.

Plot 

A man love for his childhood crush disrupts peace and ensues chaos in his village.

Cast 

 Karthik Rathnam as Krishna
 Naveen Chandra as SI Ranjith
 Krishna Priya as Pushpa
 Suhas as Koti
 Sai Kumar as Ramanna
 Subhalekha Sudhakar
 Aamani as Ramanna's wife
 Pavitra Lokesh as Lakshmi
 Raja Ravindra as Veeranna
 Ajay as Ravinder
 Ramaraju as Village head
 Anil Geela as Krishna's friend
 Thummala Narsimha Reddy
 Gautam Raju
 Rajsekhar Aningi
 Sharanya Pradeep
 Dayanand Reddy
 Roja Bharati

Production 
Principal photography of the film began in 2019. Most of the scenes were shot in Nirmal, Telangana.

Music 

Lyrical version of "Arey Meriseyle Meriseyle" sung by Shankar Mahadevan was released on 5 June 2021. "Errani Sooreede" song was released on 12 March 2021.

Release 
The film was earlier scheduled for a theatrical release. But, it was then decided to release on Aha on 26 March 2021. Due to some production issues, it was again re-scheduled, and a new release date was announced as 11 June 2021.

Reception 
Sravan Vanaparthy of The Times of India, rated the film 2.5/5 and opined that the film could not reach its potential due to lackluster screenplay. On performances, Vanaparthy stated: "While both the leads Karthik and Priya deliver a great performance, it does not make up for the weak storyline. Naveen Chandra’s character as a trigger-happy police officer leaves him with little scope to perform," while praising the production values. Cinema Express critic Ram Venkat Srikar who gave the film 1.5 stars out of 5 felt that though the film was well-intentioned, it misfired due to poor execution.

A reviewer from Eenadu wrote, "." Anji Shetty of Sakshi who granted the film 2.5 stars out of 5 enchoed the same. Shetty appreciated the performances of the leads and music while pointing out screenplay as its weak point.

A critic of LetsOTT gave a rating of 3 out of 5 and appreciated the performances done by various actors and the direction.

References

External links 

 
Ardha Shathabdham on Aha

2021 films
2020s Telugu-language films
Films about social issues in India
Films set in Telangana
Aha (streaming service) original films
Indian action drama films
Films set in 2003